Concord Mills is a shopping mall located in Concord, North Carolina. It is one of two malls in Concord, the other being Carolina Mall.

Inside, a single main hallway runs around the building in an O shape, with stores along either side.
Formerly operated by the Mills Corporation, it is now managed by Simon Property Group, who owns 59.3% of it. It is North Carolina's largest single-site tourist attraction, attracting 17.6 million visitors in 2005. The mall is located about a mile from Charlotte Motor Speedway.

Incidents
As a result of the explosion, law enforcement officials closed local roads around the mall and Interstate 85 around rush hour (4 p.m.); the roads were reopened one hour later after the situation was contained. The event received national network television coverage and news helicopters provided much of the video shown on national television.

In March 2019, a man was shot by an 18 year old male inside the AMC theater after a dispute over seating. This incident lead to yet another panic which resulted in a total evacuation. The suspect was arrested the following day and charged with assault with a deadly weapon and intent to kill.

In December 2019, a 13 year old girl was struck and killed by a stray bullet after she attempted to escape a fight between a group of teenage males. Two other teenagers were also shot but did not receive life threatening injuries. In an unrelated case, the girl's cousin was himself murdered earlier the same hour. One of the suspects in the shooting was arrested and charged with first-degree murder and felony riot on the Wednesday morning following the attack. Two days later, Police announced they had arrested another suspect. This was the first instance of murder on mall property.

See also 
 I-85 Corridor
 List of shopping malls in the United States

References

External links 

Mills
Shopping malls in Charlotte, North Carolina
Outlet malls in the United States
Shopping malls established in 1999
Simon Property Group
Buildings and structures in Cabarrus County, North Carolina
Tourist attractions in Cabarrus County, North Carolina
1999 establishments in North Carolina